Rajjo is a 2013 Indian romantic musical produced by Four Pillars Entertainment and directed by Sahitya Akademi Award-winning writer Vishwas Patil. It stars Kangana Ranaut and newcomer Paras Arora in the lead roles and its supporting cast includes Prakash Raj, Mahesh Manjrekar and Jaya Prada. The film released in theatres on 15 November 2013. The film that earned 2 crores at the domestic box office bore a loss of 10 crores on the venture.

Plot
A romantic musical, Rajjo is the journey of a Nautch girl in the most extraordinary circumstances. It tells the love story of Rajjo (Kangana Ranaut) and Chandu (Paras Arora) set against the backdrop of the dying Kothas of Mumbai that nurtured the traditional art of singing and dancing for centuries.

The story's central characters are Rajjo, a Muslim girl and Chandu, a young Brahmin boy. When Chandu helps his team win a cricket match, the team decides to celebrate the victory by visiting the Kothas of Nagpada. This is where Chandu meets Rajjo who mesmerizes him with her elegant Mujra dance and it is love at first sight for him.

Chandu belongs to a family of music lovers; he is a very good harmonium player, his mother is a Bhajan singer. Rajjo is trained under Kothewali Amma; she is naughty, sweet and quite attractive. Music is the common thread between them, as is the strong attraction that draws Rajjo and Chandu together and seals their love. Simultaneously the Nagpada area goes under the clutches of re-development and all the dancers and singers are under the shadow of this potential danger. Amidst these circumstances, Rajjo and Chandu have to deal with Begum (Mahesh Manjrekar) who runs the Kotha and Hande Bhau (Prakash Raj), a corporator with powerful political connections who has his eye on Rajjo.

Cast

 Kangana Ranaut as Rajjo
 Paras Arora as Chandu
 Sadhana Sharma as Chanda Chandu's Sister
 Mahesh Manjrekar as Begum
 Prakash Raj as Hande Bhau
 Jaya Prada as Jankidevi
 Sharad Shelar
Deepika Amin as Kamladevi
 Alok as Chandu's Friend
Rakesh Barsewal as Hijra
 Shruti Bisht as Young Rajjo
 Swati Chitnis as Ammi
 Avtar Gill as Acharya Deshbhushan
Ravi Hande as Vikram Hande
Ateshan Hussein as Jaggu (Govind Hande's PA)
Anand Ingle as Meghraj Shetty
Kinjal Jain as Chandu's Sister
Jaiveer as Chandu's Friend
Kishore Kadam as Daadi Patil
 Mazhar Khan as Hirja
 Suhas Khandke as Professor 
Shubhangi Latkar as Chandu's Mother
Upendra Limaye as Inspector Salunkhe
Manmauji as Chacha (Garage)
 Naren as NGO guy
Girish Pal as Hirja
Atul Patil as Chotelal
Piyusha Patil as Sana 
 Poonampreet Bhatia as Acharya Deshbhushan's PA
Aarti Rana as Kotha Girl
Shivani Rawat as  Sakina 
Rutwik as Chandu's Friend
 Sachi as Salunke's Daughter
Rajesh Sahu as Hirja
Kuldeep Sarin as C.M.	
Sumit Senapati as Chandu's Friend
Nitesh Shah as Chandu's Friend
Vipin Sharma as Chandu's Father
Rizwana Sheikh as Kotha Girl
Shashank Shende as Gannewala
Soham Shah as NGO guy
Dalip Tahil as Lala Pathan
C.P. Thakur as Bank Manager
Atul Tiwari as Builder Patel
Sanjay Tripathi as Hijra
 Vedita as Kotha Girl

Development

Pre-Production and Production
The lead star of the film Kangana Ranaut did extensive research in order to prepare for her role in the film. She visited Kothas and met with women there to understand their body language and mindset.

The makers of the film reportedly spent Rs. 5 crore to recreate the ambiance of Mumbai's red light area, Kamathipura, for their film. It took two months for around 700 workers to construct the set under the guidance of art director Muneesh Sappel.

The music of the film was recorded in London's Abbey Road Studios by composer Uttam Singh.

Crew
Banner - Four Pillars Entertainment Pvt. Ltd.
Distribution - WAVE CINEMA Ponty Chadha Release.
Director- Vishwas Patil
Producer- M. H. Shah & U. A. Karande 
Cinematographer - Binod Pradhan
Music & Background Score- Uttam Singh
Editor- Rajesh Rao
Production Designer- Muneesh Sappel
Executive  Producer - Priyadarshini
Original Story- Jayant Pawar
Screenplay - Vishwas Patil
Lyrics - Sameer Anjaan, Dev Kohli
Action Director- Salam Ansari
Choreographer- Ganesh Acharya
Dialogue- Atul Tiwari & Vishwas Patil
Sound Design - Vikram Biswas
Costume Designer - Reza Shariffi
Art Director

Soundtrack

Music of film is composed by Uttam Singh, lyrics penned by Sameer and Dev Kohli.

References

External links

2013 films
Indian romantic musical films
Films set in Mumbai
Films about courtesans in India